Traverse City State Park, officially named Keith J. Charters Traverse City State Park, is a  state park in East Bay Township just east of Traverse City in the U.S. state of Michigan.

The park is located on the southern shoreline of East Grand Traverse Bay, a bay of Lake Michigan, and is used mainly as a campground. US-31/M-72 runs between the park proper and a beach area; there is an overpass by way of which campers can get to the beach. The beach area has a playground, grills and picnic tables. The camping area has around 350 campsites, all with electricity. Other features include a dump and fill station, three bathroom buildings, and a recycling/trash center. To the south the park adjoins the TART Trail, a 10.5-mile bicycle trail that runs through Traverse City.

On July 21, 2011, the Michigan Natural Resources Commission augmented the name of the park with that of Keith J. Charters, a local conservationist, hunter and angler who served on the commission from 1994 to 2010.

References

External links
Keith J. Charters Traverse City State Park Michigan Department of Natural Resources
Keith J. Charters Traverse City State Park Map Michigan Department of Natural Resources

Protected areas of Grand Traverse County, Michigan
Traverse City, Michigan
State parks of Michigan
Protected areas established in 1920
1920 establishments in Michigan
IUCN Category III